Joseph Peabody (December 9, 1757 – January 5, 1844) was a merchant and shipowner who dominated trade between Massachusetts and the Far East for a number of years.

Family and career
He was descended from Francis Peabody of St. Albans, England, in 1635. He was one of the first settlers of Topsfield, Massachusetts. During the American Revolutionary War he was an officer on privateers, and acted with credit as second officer of the letter of marque Ranger. He was captain of several merchant vessels, and his company built 83 ships. He became extremely wealthy and used that wealth for philanthropy.

Peabody was the wealthiest merchant-shipowner of Salem, Massachusetts between the embargo of 1807 and 1845.

Brig Leander
His brig Leander  tons, built at Salem in 1821, made twenty-six voyages to Europe, Asia Minor, Africa, and the Far East in the twenty-three years of her life.

Ship George
Built at Salem for a privateer in 1814, she was purchased by Mr. Peabody for USD $5,250. It is said that she made Salem in forty-one days from the Cape of Good Hope in 1831. George made twenty-one round voyages from Salem to Calcutta between 1815 and 1837, with such regularity that she was called the "Salem Frigate." Salem vessels were always manned in part by local boys. Twenty-six of George's went on to become mates and forty-five captains.

Pepper trade and China trade
For several years Joseph Peabody competed in the China trade, and continued the famous pepper trade between Salem, Massachusetts and Sumatra.

Capture of the Friendship by pirates
In 1830 Peabody's ship Friendship was attacked and captured off the village of Quallah-Battoo (Kuala Batee, South West Aceh, Aceh, Indonesia) by Malay pirates while loading pepper. The ship James Monroe of New York set out to recover the Friendship, with the help of crew from Governor Endicott of New York and brig Palmer. The pirates initially refused to surrender, but jumped overboard and fled after the three ships opened fire on the village. The following morning, four Friendship survivors in poor condition showed up in a small boat, having swum two miles down the coast and hidden in the jungle in order to escape the pirates.

In reprisal for the massacre of the crew of the Friendship, a punitive expedition was launched in 1832, now known as the First Sumatran Expedition.

Family
In 1791, Peabody married his first wife, Catherine, who was the daughter of a minister friend. She died within a couple of years. In 1795, he married Catherine's sister, Elizabeth. They had four children. His first son, Joseph Augustus (1796–1828), graduated from Harvard in 1816. Another son, George, was father-in-law of William Crowninshield Endicott.

One of Peabody's descendants was Augustus Peabody Gardner.

See also
First Sumatran Expedition

References

This article incorporates text found in the public domain because it was published before 1923.

1757 births
1844 deaths
Joseph
People of Massachusetts in the American Revolution
People from Topsfield, Massachusetts
People from Salem, Massachusetts
Pepper trade
American businesspeople in shipping
Maritime history of India
History of Sumatra